is a former Japanese football player and manager currently manager in charge of Japan Football League club Sony Sendai.

Club career
Suzuki was born in Watari, Miyagi on August 17, 1961. After graduating from University of Tsukuba, he joined Japan Soccer League club Fujita Industries in 1984. From 1989, he played his local club Matsushima SC and Brummell Sendai. In 1996, he retired.

National team career
In 1979, when Suzuki was a high school student, he selected Japan U-20 national team for 1979 World Youth Championship in Japan. At this competition, he played 2 matches.

Coaching career
On 2004, Suzuki started his coaching career, signing for J2 League side Montedio Yamagata, leaving the club after two seasons. From 2006 to 2009, he was the manager for J1 League side Albirex Niigata, doing a well work there, and becoming an idol for their fans. In April 2010, he was named the new Omiya Ardija manager, following Chang Woe-Ryong's departure, but his work at the club was known more from failures than success. In May 2012, he was sacked from Omiya.

On 2013, Suzuki was named the manager of J2 League side JEF United Chiba, but failed to get promotion to J1 League. On 2014, after a poor half-season, including a 0–6 loss to Shonan Bellmare at home, and the poor performance of the club, he was sacked on 23 June 2014.

On 11 January 2022, he was appointed manager at Sony Sendai FC.

Managerial statistics

References

External links

1961 births
Living people
University of Tsukuba alumni
Association football people from Miyagi Prefecture
Japanese footballers
Japan youth international footballers
Japan Soccer League players
Japan Football League (1992–1998) players
Shonan Bellmare players
Vegalta Sendai players
Japanese football managers
J1 League managers
J2 League managers
Montedio Yamagata managers
Albirex Niigata managers
Omiya Ardija managers
JEF United Chiba managers
Association football midfielders